The Equality Act 2010 is an Act of Parliament of the United Kingdom passed during the Brown ministry with the primary purpose of consolidating, updating and supplementing the numerous prior Acts and Regulations, that formed the basis of anti-discrimination law in mostly England, Scotland and Wales; some sections also apply to Northern Ireland. These consisted, primarily, of the Equal Pay Act 1970, the Sex Discrimination Act 1975, the Race Relations Act 1976, the Disability Discrimination Act 1995 and three major statutory instruments protecting discrimination in employment on grounds of religion or belief, sexual orientation and age.

The Act has broadly the same goals as the four major EU Equal Treatment Directives, whose provisions it mirrors and implements. However, the Act also offers protection beyond the EU directives, protecting against discrimination based on a person's nationality and citizenship and also extending individuals' rights in areas of life beyond the workplace in religion or belief, disability, age, sex, sexual orientation and gender reassignment.

The Act protects people against discrimination, harassment or victimisation in employment, and as users of private and public services based on nine protected characteristics:  age, disability, gender reassignment, marriage and civil partnership, pregnancy and maternity, race, religion or belief, sex, and sexual orientation. The Act includes provisions for single-sex services where the restrictions are "a proportionate means of achieving a legitimate aim". In the case of disability, employers and service providers are under a duty to make reasonable adjustments to their workplaces to overcome barriers experienced by disabled people. In this regard, the Equality Act 2010 did not change the law. Under s.217, with limited exceptions the Act does not apply to Northern Ireland.

Background

The Labour Party included a commitment to an Equality Bill in its 2005 election manifesto. The Discrimination Law Review was established in 2005 to develop the legislation and was led by the Government Equalities Office. The review considered the findings of the Equalities Review Panel, chaired by Trevor Phillips, which reported in February 2007. The Act is intended to simplify the law by bringing together existing anti-discrimination legislation. The Equality Act 2010 has replaced the Equal Pay Act 1970, Sex Discrimination Act 1975, Race Relations Act 1976, Disability Discrimination Act 1995, Employment Equality (Religion or Belief) Regulations 2003, Employment Equality (Sexual Orientation) Regulations 2003 and the Employment Equality (Age) Regulations 2006.

Polly Toynbee wrote that the bill, which was drafted under the guidance of Harriet Harman, was "Labour's biggest idea for 11 years. A public-sector duty to close the gap between rich and poor will tackle the class divide in a way that no other policy has... This new duty to narrow the gap would permeate every aspect of government policy. Its possible ramifications are mind-bogglingly immense." One cabinet member described it as "socialism in one clause". This part of the legislation was never brought into force, except for Scottish devolved authorities.

Sections 104–105 of the Act extend until 2030 the exemption from sex discrimination law, which allows political parties to create all-women shortlists. The exemption was previously permitted by the Sex Discrimination (Election Candidates) Act 2002.

The Parliamentary process was completed, following a debate, shortly after 11 pm on 6 April 2010, when amendments by the House of Lords were accepted in full.

Debate

Reform of the monarchy
In April 2008, Solicitor General Vera Baird announced that as part of the Single Equality Bill, legislation would be introduced to repeal parts of the Act of Settlement 1701 that prevent Roman Catholics or those who marry Roman Catholics from ascending to the throne, and to change the inheritance of the monarchy from cognatic primogeniture to absolute primogeniture, so that the first-born heir would inherit the throne regardless of gender or religion.

However, later in 2008, the Attorney General Baroness Scotland of Asthal decided not to sponsor a change in the law of succession, saying, "To bring about changes to the law on succession would be a complex undertaking involving amendment or repeal of a number of items of related legislation, as well as requiring the consent of legislatures of member nations of the Commonwealth". The published draft bill did not contain any provisions to change the succession laws. Cognatic primogeniture for the British monarchy was instead abolished separately three years after the Equality Act came into force, with the enactment of the Succession to the Crown Act 2013.

Opposition by Roman Catholic Bishops
Although the act was never going to change the law with regard to churches from its existing position, nor change the binding European Union law which covers many more Roman Catholics than those living in the United Kingdom, and although the position had been spelled out in the High Court in R (Amicus) v Secretary of State for Trade and Industry, a small number of Roman Catholic bishops in England and Wales made claims that they might in future be prosecuted under the Equality Act 2010 for refusing to allow women, married men, transgender people, and gay people into the priesthood. This claim was rejected by the government.  A spokesman said an exemption in the law "covers ministers of religion such as Catholic priests" and a document released by the Government Equalities Office states that "the Equality Bill will not change the existing legal position regarding churches and employment". The legislation was also criticised by Anglican clergy.

Exempt occupations

Certain employment is exempted from the Act, including:

Priests, monks, nuns, rabbis and ministers of religion
Actors and models in the film, television and fashion industries (a British Chinese actress for a specific role, for instance).
Special employment training programmes aimed at ethnic minorities, ex-offenders, young adults, the long term unemployed, or people with physical or learning disabilities.
Employment where there are cultural sensitivities (such as a documentary where male victims of domestic violence need to be interviewed by a male researcher, or a gay men's domestic violence helpline).
Where safety or operational efficiency could be jeopardised.
Political parties who use 'protected characteristics' (age, race, religion, sex, sexual orientation) as candidate selection criteria; however, these 'Selection arrangements do not include short-listing only such persons as have a particular protected characteristic' other than sex, which may still be used to prejudice selection in some circumstances (e.g. all-women/all-men shortlists).
Local support staff who work in embassies and high commissions, by virtue of diplomatic immunity.
Where national security could be jeopardised.

Contents

Part 1 Socio-economic inequalities
 The UK government has indicated its intention not to bring Part 1 into force with respect to UK public authorities.
 However, the Scottish government has brought this section into force with respect to devolved Scottish authorities. It came into force for these authorities on 1 April 2018, with the legal requirements placed on these authorities by this part of the Act being referred to by the Scottish government as the Fairer Scotland Duty.
 The Welsh government also has the power to bring this section into force with respect to devolved Welsh authorities, but has not yet done so.
Part 2 Equality: key concepts
Chapter 1 Protected characteristics
Chapter 2 Prohibited conduct
Part 3 Services and public functions
Part 4 Premises
Part 5 Work
Chapter 1 Employment, etc.
Chapter 2 Occupational pension schemes
Chapter 3 Equality of terms
Chapter 4 Supplementary
Part 6 Education
Chapter 1 Schools
Chapter 2 Further and higher education
Chapter 3 General qualifications bodies
Chapter 4 Miscellaneous
Part 7 Associations
Part 8 Prohibited conduct: ancillary
Part 9 Enforcement
Chapter 1 Introductory
Chapter 2 Civil courts
Chapter 3 Employment tribunals
Chapter 4 Equality of terms
Chapter 5 Miscellaneous
Part 10 Contracts, etc.
Part 11 Advancement of equality	
Chapter 1 Public sector equality duty
Chapter 2 Positive action
Part 12 Disabled persons: transport
Chapter 1 Taxis etc.
Chapter 2 Public service vehicles
Chapter 3 Rail vehicles
Chapter 4 Supplementary
Part 13 Disability: miscellaneous
Part 14 General exceptions
Part 15 General and miscellaneous

Public sector equality duty
The duty set out in section 149 requires those public authorities which are subject to it to have due regard to three aims:
to eliminate unlawful discrimination, harassment, victimisation and any other conduct prohibited under the Act,
to advance equality of opportunity between people who share a protected characteristic and those who do not, and 
to foster good relations between those who share a protected characteristic and those who do not.

The Cabinet Office's Information Note 1/13, "Public Procurement and the Public Sector Equality Duty", noted that public authorities needed to have due regard to tis duty when planning and undertaking procurement activities, stating in particular that when contracting out public functions, it would be usual to include contract conditions which specified how equality obligations and objectives were to be complied with.

Equality Act 2010 (Specific Duties) Regulations
The Equality Act 2010 (Specific Duties) Regulations 2011 (SI 2011–2260), made on 9 September 2011, required public authorities to publish information to demonstrate their compliance with the public sector equality duty and to identify one or more objectives which they thought they should work to achieve.

Legal challenges

In 2020, certain groups attempted to legally challenge the EHRC's Code of Practice on "Services, Public Functions and Associations", which attempts to provide practical guidance on implementing the Equality Act, concerning the advice that service providers should in general treat trans people as their acquired gender. The challenge failed to get a hearing before the High Court of Justice, because the justice did not consider the case to be arguable.

See also
UK employment equality law
Equality Impact Assessment
Mandla v Dowell-Lee
Gender Recognition Act

Notes

References
E. McGaughey, A Casebook on Labour Law (Hart 2019) chs 12–14
S. Deakin and G. Morris, Labour Law (Hart 2012) ch 6 
Polly Toynbee, 'Harman's law is Labour's biggest idea for 11 years' (13 January 2009) The Guardian

External links
What is the Equality Act? – Equality and Human Rights Commission
Framework For a Fairer Future  – Government Equalities Office

Parliament page for the progress of the Bill
Government Equalities Office page on the Equality Bill 
 Equality Act Guidance, updated 8 March 2013
Image of the Act on the UK Parliamentary website

Affirmative action in Europe
Disability legislation
Anti-discrimination law in the United Kingdom
Equality rights
United Kingdom Acts of Parliament 2010
Race relations in the United Kingdom
2010 in LGBT history
2010 in religion
Transgender law in the United Kingdom
April 2010 events in the United Kingdom